Jameson Rodgers (born October 17, 1987) is an American country music singer and songwriter signed to Columbia Nashville/River House, whose debut single "Some Girls" charted on the Country Airplay chart.

Early life
Jameson Rodgers grew up in Batesville, Mississippi, United States.  Rodgers loved baseball and music and played baseball at Northwest MS Community College before finishing college at University of Southern Mississippi.  Rodgers started to write songs and perform, eventually developing a local following along the way. He later moved to Nashville in 2010 with his friend and never left.

Career
In 2014, Rodgers received The ASCAP Foundation Leon Brettler Award and landed a publishing deal with Combustion Music. In 2016, he released his first EP and two years later, a self-titled EP in 2018, which featured the hit "Some Girls". The song was featured on SiriusXM's The Highway and has over 80 million streams. Rodgers has co-penned Platinum-selling hits for Florida Georgia Line (Top 10 single "Talk You Out of It") and Chris Lane (No. 1 hit "I Don't Know About You"), along with "Camouflage Hat" on Jason Aldean's 2019 album 9 and the title track of Luke Bryan's 2020 album Born Here Live Here Die Here. Jameson won the 2020 MusicRow Discovery Artist of the Year award. Rodgers spent 2019 supporting Luke Combs on his Beer Never Broke My Heart Tour, playing more than 60 arenas across the US and Canada.

Pandora Radio named Jameson Rodgers one of 2018 Country Artists to Watch.

In 2019, Rodgers signed a recording deal with River House Artists/Columbia Nashville.

In 2020, he achieved his first charting song on the Billboard charts; his debut hit "Some Girls" reached number one on the Country Airplay chart and number 29 on the Billboard Hot 100.

Discography

Albums
Bet You're from a Small Town (2021) – No. 182 US Billboard 200, No. 23 US Top Country Albums

EPs
Jameson Rodgers EP (Independent, 2016) 
Jameson Rodgers (Independent, 2018) – No. 42 US Top Country Albums
In It for the Money (River House/Columbia Nashville, 2021) – No. 41 US Top Country Albums

Singles

References

External links
Official website

1987 births
American country singer-songwriters
People from Batesville, Mississippi
Country musicians from Mississippi
Living people
Singer-songwriters from Mississippi